The 1840 United States presidential election in New Hampshire took place between October 30 and December 2, 1840, as part of the 1840 United States presidential election. Voters chose seven representatives, or electors to the Electoral College, who voted for President and Vice President.

New Hampshire voted for the Democratic candidate, Martin Van Buren, over Whig candidate William Henry Harrison. Van Buren won New Hampshire by a margin of 10.78%.

Results

See also
 United States presidential elections in New Hampshire

References

New Hampshire
1840
1840 New Hampshire elections